This is a list of moths of the family Erebidae that are found in India. It also acts as an index to the species articles and forms part of the full List of moths of India.

Subfamily Acontiinae
 Acontia marmoralis (Fabricius, 1794)

Subfamily Arctiinae
Spilarctia bifascia Hampson, 1891
Spilarctia casigneta (Kollar, 1844)
Spilarctia castanea (Hampson, 1893)
Spilarctia coorgensis Kirti & Gill, 2010
Spilarctia lutea (Hufnagel, 1766)
Spilarctia mona (Swinhoe, 1885)
Spilarctia obliqua (Walker, 1855)
Spilarctia todara (Moore, 1872)

Subfamily Boletobiinae
 Araeopteron fasciale (Hampson, 1896)
 Araeopteron goniophora Hampson, 1907
 Araeopteron griseata Hampson, 1907
 Araeopteron nivalis (Hampson, 1907)
 Araeopteron pictale Hampson, 1893
 Araeopteron poliophaea (Hampson, 1910)
 Araeopteron proleuca Hampson, 1907
 Araeopteron rufescens (Hampson, 1910)
 Araeopteron xanthopis (Hampson, 1907)
 Cretonia vegetus (Swinhoe, 1885)
 Lophoruza lunifera (Moore, [1885] 1884–1887)
 Metaemene atriguttata (Walker, 1862)
 Zurobata vacillans (Walker, 1864)

Subfamily Herminiinae
 Bertula partita Hampson, 1891
 Hydrillodes abavalis (Walker, [1859] 1858)
 Hydrillodes hemusalis (Walker, [1859] 1858)
 Hydrillodes lentalis Guenée, 1854
 Mixomelia albapex (Hampson, 1895)
 Mixomelia duplexa (Moore, 1882)
 Mixomelia relata (Hampson, 1891)
 Naarda calligrapha  Tóth & Ronkay, 2015 
 Naarda fuscicosta (Hampson, 1891)
 Naarda inouei  Tóth & Ronkay, 2015
 Naarda molybdota (Hampson, 1912) 
 Naarda numismata  Tóth & Ronkay, 2015
 Nodaria externalis Guenée, 1854
 Nodaria fusca Hampson, 1895
 Nodaria simplex Hampson, 1898
 Polypogon fractalis (Guenée, 1854)
 Simplicia butesalis (Walker, 1858)
 Simplicia mistacalis Guenée, 1854
 Simplicia niphona (Butler, 1878)
 Simplicia robustalis (Guenée, 1854)
 Simplicia xanthoma Prout, 1928

Subfamily Hypeninae
 Acidon albolineata (Hampson, 1895)
 Acidon evae Lödl, 1998
 Acidon hemiphaea (Hampson 1906)
 Acidon nigribasis (Hampson, 1895)
 Acidon steniptera (Hampson, 1902)
 Acidon rectilineata (Hampson, 1896)
 Anoratha paritalis (Walker, [1859] 1858)
 Catada bipartita (Moore, 1882)
 Hiaspis fuscobrunnea (Hampson, 1895)
 Hypena albisigna Moore, 1882
 Hypena ciaridoides Moore, 1882
 Hypena iconicalis Walker, [1859] 1858
 Hypena indicatalis Walker, [1859] 1858
 Hypena labatalis Walker, [1859] 1858
 Hypena laceratalis Walker, [1859] 1858
 Hypena nocturnalis Swinhoe, 1896
 Hypena occatus Hampson, 1882
 Hypena ophiusoides Moore, 1882
 Hypena rhombalis Guenée, 1854
 Hypena thermesialis Walker, [1866] 1865
 Itmaharela basalis Moore, 1882
 Lysimelia alstoni Holloway, 1979
 Lysimelia neleusalis Walker, [1859] 1858
 Sarobela litterata (Pagenstecher, 1888)
 Rhynchina obliqualis (Kollar, 1844)

Subfamily Rivulinae
 Rivula basalis Hampson, 1891
 Rivula bioculalis Moore, 1877
 Rivula curvifera (Walker, 1862)
 Rivula niveipuncta Swinhoe, 1905
 Rivula ochracea (Moore, 1882)
 Rivula pallida Moore, 1882
 Rivula striatura Swinhoe, 1895

References

 
x
M